Freedom (IX-43), an unclassified miscellaneous vessel, was the second ship of the United States Navy of that name. An auxiliary schooner, she was acquired by the Navy in 1940, and assigned to the United States Naval Academy where she served in a noncommissioned status through 1962.

History
An Act of Congress of 6 June 1940 authorized the Secretary of the Navy to accept without expense to the Government the 88-foot 2-masted schooner FREEDOM and her equipment as a gift from her owner, Sterling Morton, to the Naval Academy. She had been designed by John G. Alden and built at Milwaukee, Wisconsin. The yacht was delivered to the Navy on 10 Sep 40 at the shipyard of Henry B. Nevins, Inc., City Island, Bronx and arrived at the Naval Academy two days later. On 24 Oct 40 CNO assigned her the class designation "Unclassified" and directed that her name be retained. On 8 Jan 41 SecNav approved the adoption by BuShips of the symbol IX, already in use in the Navy Filing Manual, for vessels designated "Unclassified," and BuShips assigned her the hull designation IX-43. She proved to be an excellent boat for ocean cruising and for teaching midshipmen how to handle a large sailing rig. She was sold in 1968 following the investigation of the faltering sailing program at the Naval Academy by the Fales Committee in the mid-1960s. Purchased by the Harry Lundeberg School of Seamanship in Annapolis, Md., she became the miscellaneous function (training) vessel Freedom and was still in service in 1972.

References

Unclassified miscellaneous vessels of the United States Navy
United States Naval Academy
Schooners of the United States Navy
Individual yachts